This is a list of repeater sites for amateur radio in Germany.

It includes towers (e.g. CN Tower and Bremen TV tower), hills, mountains and other locations.

List

See also
Deutscher Amateur-Radio-Club

References

Amateur radio
Amateur radio-related lists
Broadcast transmitters
Radio in Germany